RFA Bacchus was a stores freighter and distilling ship of the Royal Fleet Auxiliary. Built by William Hamilton and Company, of Port Glasgow for the Indo-China Steam Navigation Company and purchased by the Admiralty while on the stocks on 22 March 1915.

Ioannis Falafos sank in three minutes with the loss of ten of her 22 crew. The survivors were initially rescued by Bacchus but she was severely damaged at the bows and was abandoned as it was thought that she would sink too. The British cargo ship  took all on board. Bacchus was later reboarded once it became apparent that she would remain afloat. She was towed into Portland Harbour stern-first by an Admiralty tug. Bacchus was subsequently repaired and returned to service.

She was renamed RFA Bacchus II in May 1936 in order to free the name for a new ship.

References

Stores ships of the Royal Fleet Auxiliary
Ships built on the River Clyde
1915 ships
Maritime incidents in 1928
Maritime incidents in 1938